Sir Ernest Hillas Williams  (16 August 1899 – 5 February 1965) was an Irish judge who served as a British Empire colonial official based for most of his career in British Hong Kong and later also the second Chief Justice of the Combined Judiciary of Sarawak, North Borneo and Brunei.

Career 

Williams received a BA in mathematics from Trinity College Dublin in 1922. While serving in the Colonial Service, Williams was promoted from colonial administrator to puisne judge and later also served as the assistant Attorney General of Hong Kong. Over the course of his time in British Hong Kong, Williams was twice appointed acting Secretary for Chinese Affairs of the Executive Council of Hong Kong. Following the events of World War II, Williams was sent to British Borneo and succeeded Sir Ivor Llewellyn Brace as Chief Justice of the Combined Judiciary of Sarawak, North Borneo and Brunei.

Williams was also a sergeant in the Hong Kong Volunteer Defence Corps.

Prisoner of war 

Williams was a prisoner of war (POW) held at a camp in Sham Shui Po Barracks before later being moved to Innoshima, Hiroshima Prefecture by the Imperial Japanese Army.

Honours 

  :
  Knight Bachelor (Kt) – Sir (1957)

Death 

Williams died in early February 1965 whilst in the town of Málaga, Spain.

See also 

 Chief Judge of Sabah and Sarawak
 Secretary for Justice (Hong Kong)

References 

1899 births
1965 deaths
People from Cork (city)
British colonial governors and administrators in Asia
British colonial officials
British Borneo judges
Sarawak, North Borneo and Brunei judges
British Hong Kong judges
Irish knights
Irish prisoners of war
Irish people imprisoned abroad
British World War II prisoners of war
World War II prisoners of war held by Japan
Knights Bachelor
British Malaya military personnel of World War II